Madaripur-3 is a constituency represented in the Jatiya Sangsad (National Parliament) of Bangladesh since 2019 by Abdus Sobhan Golap of the Awami League.

Boundaries 
The constituency encompasses Kalkini Upazila and five union parishads of Madaripur Sadar Upazila: Ghatmajhi, Jhaudi, Kendua, Khoajpur, and Mustafapur.

History 
The constituency was created in 1984 from a Faridpur constituency when the former Faridpur District was split into five districts: Rajbari, Faridpur, Gopalganj, Madaripur, and Shariatpur.

Members of Parliament

Elections

Elections in the 2010s 
AFM Bahauddin Nasim was elected unopposed in the 2014 general election after opposition parties withdrew their candidacies in a boycott of the election.

Elections in the 2000s

Elections in the 1990s

References

External links
 

Parliamentary constituencies in Bangladesh
Madaripur District